James Frank Stewart (July 29, 1930 – December 5, 2022) was an American record producer and executive who in 1957 co-founded, with his sister Estelle, Stax Records, one of the leading recording companies during soul and R&B music's heyday. The label also scored many hits on the Billboard Hot 100 pop music chart, and internationally, during this time.

Life and career 
Stewart was born on July 29, 1930. Raised on a farm in Middleton, Tennessee, he moved to Memphis in 1948 after graduating from high school, then worked at Sears and the First National Bank before being drafted into the United States Army. After serving for two years, Stewart returned to his job as a bank clerk in Memphis in 1953.

Stewart was a part-time fiddle player and joined a local country music group, the Canyon Cowboys. He worked days as a banker at Union Planters Bank. In 1957, Stewart launched his own record label, then called Satellite Records, which issued country music and rockabilly records. His sister, Estelle Axton, mortgaged her home to invest in her brother's venture by buying an Ampex 300 tape recorder.

In 1959, the label moved into the former Capitol Theatre in Memphis (The label's name 'STAX' is a combination of STewart and AXton). The auditorium was converted to studio space, and the stage was made into the control room. To save money, Stewart did not level the floor. This created unique acoustics, which are noticeable in the recordings made there, with many featuring a heavy, bassy sound.

After selling millions of records during its history, Stax went bankrupt in 1976. Stewart kept a low profile and intensely protected his privacy. When he was inducted into the Rock and Roll Hall of Fame in 2002, he sent his granddaughter Jennifer to the induction ceremony to accept the award on his behalf.

In 2018, Stewart made a rare public appearance at the Stax Museum to donate his fiddle to the museum.

Stewart died on December 5, 2022, at the age of 92.

Work
Some of the R & B artists who worked with Stewart include: William Bell, Booker T & the MGs, Eddie Floyd, Isaac Hayes, Otis Redding, Carla Thomas, and Sam & Dave.

References

External links 
Biography from the Rock and Roll Hall of Fame web site
[ Allmusic]
 
 

1930 births
2022 deaths
American music industry executives
Record producers from Tennessee
People from Middleton, Tennessee
People from Memphis, Tennessee
Stax Records